Kaberry is a surname. Notable people with the surname include:

Anthony Kaberry (born 1971), Australian rugby league footballer
Donald Kaberry, Baron Kaberry of Adel (1907–1991), British politician
Phyllis Kaberry (1910–1977), Australian anthropologist

See also
Kaberry baronets